Helge Törn (born 15 December 1928) is a Finnish cyclist. He competed in the men's sprint event at the 1952 Summer Olympics.

References

External links
 

1928 births
Possibly living people
Finnish male cyclists
Olympic cyclists of Finland
Cyclists at the 1952 Summer Olympics
Sportspeople from Helsinki